Martha Stewart Baby was a childcare magazine published between 2000 and 2003. The magazine, of which first issue appeared in March 2000, specialized in projects and topics for parents related to the care of newborns to toddlers. It was published biannually by Martha Stewart Living Omnimedia.

The first issue of Martha Stewart Baby was dated Baby 2000. A total of seven issues were published. The last issue of the magazine published in Spring 2003.

References

Biannual magazines published in the United States
Defunct magazines published in the United States
Lifestyle magazines published in the United States
Magazines established in 2000
Magazines disestablished in 2003
Parenting magazines
Martha Stewart Living Omnimedia